is a Japanese publishing company founded in 1947 by Hideto Furuoka, which also produces educational toys. Their annual sales are reported at ¥ 90 billion ($789 million US).

Gakken publishes educational books and magazines and produces other education-related products. For nursery school age children and their caretakers, they produce items such as child care and nursing guides.  For school children, they publish text books, encyclopedias, and science books. Gakken also publishes educational magazines for high school students, as well as school guides for all levels.  Gakken also provides products for playrooms, study rooms, computer rooms and science rooms.

Gakken also publishes general family-oriented and gender-oriented magazines in sports, music, art, history, animation, cooking, and puzzles.

History 
Gakken is perhaps originally known for producing Denshi blocks and packaging them within electronic toy kits such as the Gakken EX-System, as far back as the 1970s. One of their original lines, the EX-150, was reissued in 2002, and was so popular as to inspire an expansion pack.

In 1981 Gakken released "Super Puck Monster", a tabletop LCD arcade game that resembled Pac-Man. Coleco also licensed "Super Puck Monster" and released it as an official Pac-Man game. Gakken also released an official Dig Dug game, unlike "Super Puck Monster" this game was only sold in Japan and never exported.

In October 1983, the Gakken Compact Vision TV Boy console was released.

Since 1993 Gakken has been publishing monthly logic puzzle magazines under the name Logic Paradise.

Gakken manufactured an 4-bit computer known as the GMC-4.

Book series
 Buttercup Babies 
 Fantasia Pictorial 
 Gakken Workbooks (also referred to as: Gakkenbooks | Play Smart Workbooks)
 Koji series
 Megami Bunko
 Nora komikkusu (= Nora Comics), also known as Cain shirizu (= Cain comics) and as Nora Cain Comics
 Rekishi Gunzo Shirizu (歴史群像シリーズ) (= History Picture Collection Series), also known as: Gakken Rekishi Gunzo Series 
 Rekishi Gunzo Taiheiyo Senshi Shirizu (歴史群像太平洋戦史シリーズ) (= Pacific Ocean Military History Picture Collection Series)   
 Picture Story Series

References

External links
Gakken Japanese homepage 
Conceptis Puzzles - Partners
BusinessWeek Magazine company profile

Book publishing companies of Japan
Comic book publishing companies of Japan
Magazine publishing companies of Japan
Publishing companies established in 1947
Japanese companies established in 1947
Companies listed on the Tokyo Stock Exchange
Japanese brands